Christian Thobo Køhler (born 10 April 1996), also known as TK, is a Danish footballer who plays as a midfielder for Fremad Amager.

Club career

FC Nordsjælland
Køhler is a product of FC Nordsjælland, which he joined as a U12 player. He got his FC Nordsjælland debut on 1 May 2016. Køhler played the whole match in a 2–2 draw against Randers FC in the Danish Superliga, where he also scored a goal.

Køhler got his contract extended in the summer 2016 until the summer 2018. After 19 league games for FCN in the 2016/17 season, Køhler became a attractive player on the market. He had interest from FC Helsingør and Viborg FF.

FC Helsingør
On 13 July 2017, newly promoted Danish Superliga-side FC Helsingør signed Køhler on a two-year contract. Køhler played his first game for the club on 16 July 2017 against Hobro IK. Køhler left the club at the end of the 2018/19 season.

Trelleborgs FF
On 12 July 2019, Køhler moved abroad and joined Swedish Superettan club Trelleborgs FF.

Esbjerg fB
After one year in Sweden, Køhler returned to Denmark and signed a one-year deal with newly relegated Danish 1st Division club Esbjerg fB. On 26 March 2021, three months before time, Køhler's contract was terminated by mutual consent after only playing six games for the club.

Valur
On 26 March 2021, the same day he terminated his contract with Esbjerg, Køhler signed with Icelandic champions Valur. On 6 October 2021 it was confirmed, that Køhler had left the club at the end of his contract, as the club had to save money due to the lack of qualification to European football.

ÍA Akranes
On 18 January 2022, Køhler signed a two-year deal with Icelandic club ÍA Akranes.

Fremad Amager
On 30 January 2023, Køhler returned to Denmark and signed a deal until June 2024 with Danish 1st Division club Fremad Amager.

References

External links
 
 Christian Køhler at DBU

Living people
1996 births
Association football midfielders
Danish men's footballers
Danish expatriate men's footballers
FC Nordsjælland players
FC Helsingør players
Trelleborgs FF players
Esbjerg fB players
Valur (men's football) players
Íþróttabandalag Akraness players
Fremad Amager players
Danish Superliga players
Danish 1st Division players
Superettan players
Denmark youth international footballers
Danish expatriate sportspeople in Sweden
Danish expatriate sportspeople in Iceland
Expatriate footballers in Sweden
Expatriate footballers in Iceland